Pavlovka is a rural locality (a selo) in Bayevsky District, Altai Krai, Russia. The population was 63 as of 2013. There are 2 streets.

Geography 
Pavlovka is located 29 km west of Bayevo (the district's administrative centre) by road. Alexandrovka is the nearest rural locality.

References 

Rural localities in Bayevsky District